Ruth Doerschuk Dicker (March 9, 1919 – December 2, 2004) was a California painter of landscapes.

Personal life
Ruth Doerschuk was born in Niagara Falls, New York, on March 9, 1919. She had a sister named Anne. She received private lessons in oil painting between the ages of nine and twelve.

Doerschuk met her husband, Ralph Dicker, in New York and they were married on August 25, 1942, in California. They raised their sons Thomas and Scott in Palo Alto, California.

Education
She went to Salem Academy and then studied art history and painting and graduated from College of William and Mary in 1940. She moved to New York City where she studied at the New York School of Fine and Applied Art and at the Art Students League under Ernest Fiene.

Career
While in New York, Dicker worked as a freelance illustrator, a fashion model and a draftsman for Sperry Gyroscope. In 1970, Dicker moved to Bennett Ridge, Santa Rosa, California, where she found her most recognizable style in depicting the landscapes of Sonoma County.

Throughout her career, her work was shown in galleries, museums, corporate offices in New York City and in and around the San Francisco Bay area. She participated in one woman or group shows at the Legion of Honor, the Oakland Museum of California, and Stanford University.  Her style includes vibrant acrylic colors, splatters of paint and strips of wood covered in rice-paper to give dimensionality and texture.

After her husband died in 1980, she enjoyed the most productive years of her career. In 1983, Dicker traveled with a group of California artists led by Earl Thollander to China. She enjoyed the art of the Southwest United States and often traveled to Santa Fe, New Mexico.

Her notable paintings include the large paintings depicting the seasons in the dining room of The Nut Tree (now closed) in Vacaville, California, and a  wood mural at the Yosemite Art and Education Center, now the Valley Wilderness Center.

Dicker died on December 2, 2004, when she was living Santa Rosa, California.

Awards
Dicker was named American Association of University Women's "Women Artist of the Year". In San Francisco, she won the Society of Women Artists' President's prize at the Museum of Art. At the De Saisset Museum she won first and second prizes.

Collections
Dicker's art is in many private and public collections in the United States and abroad, including:
 Bank of America
 Barnes-Hine Pharmaceutical
 Crown Zellerbach
 Harrah's, Reno
 Price Waterhouse Coopers
 Wells Fargo Bank

Exhibitions

 Impressions of Trees - Stanford Research Institute - 1961
 the little studio, New York City - 1962
 Gallery House, Menlo Park, California
 Quay Gallery, Tiburon, California
Forth Winter Invitational Exhibition - Legion of Honor - 1962
The Nut Tree - 1964
San Francisco Women Artists Fortieth Annual Exhibition - San Francisco Museum of Art - 1965
85th Annual Exhibition - San Francisco Museum of Art - 1966
The Nut Tree - 1974
Painted Wood Constructions and Assemblages - The Marshall Gallery, Tomales Bay, California
Arlene Lind Gallery, San Francisco, California
Piper Sonoma - 1983
Marin County Civic Center - 1983
California Museum of Art, Santa Rosa, California - 1985
Spring Invitational Exhibition - Alden Arts Gallery, Santa Rosa, California  - 1986
An Exhibition of bas relief painting - Sterling Vineyards - 1987
Vineyards and Beyond - Kaiser Arts Center Gallery, Oakland, California - 1987
The Nut Tree - 1989
The Nut Tree - 1993
Marin County Civic Center - 1994
Indian Summer - Danny & Company, Santa Rosa, California - 1995
Mixed Media Paintings - Solano Bank - 2001
Nut Tree Artist Reunion - Vacaville Museum - 2003
12th ROTATION, Honoring the Art of Ruth Dicker - Next Level Communications - 2003

References

1919 births
2004 deaths
College of William & Mary alumni
American landscape painters
American women painters
Painters from California
20th-century American painters
20th-century American women artists